Shirine Khoury-Haq (born 1971) is a British and Australian businesswoman, and CEO of The Co-operative Group since August 2022. She is the first female chief executive of the business since the Co-op was founded in 1863. Prior to joining the Co-op in 2019, she was COO of Lloyd's of London.

Early life and education 
Khoury-Haq was born in Beirut, Lebanon, and is of Arabic and Turkish heritage. Her father worked in the oil industry, so they lived in several countries growing up. She learned English, French, Spanish, and Portuguese, in addition to her native Turkish language.

She attended high school in Australia, followed by the Australian National University, where she earned a bachelor of commerce degree in accounting and economics. She earned an MBA from Ohio State University and is a US certified public accountant, and holds a postgraduate management diploma from University of the West of England in Bristol.

Career 
Early in her career, Khoury-Haq worked in finance and operations at McDonald's, and was responsible for improving sales and profitability at 160 restaurants. She then moved to IBM, and was based in the US for three years, followed by six years in the UK.

In 2007, she became group head of operations and UK chief operating officer at Catlin Group, which was then the largest syndicate and managing agent within Lloyd's of London. In 2014, she was appointed COO of Lloyd's of London, where she remained for five years, and implemented a programme to modernise the way that Lloyd's operates, by using technology and hiring people from outside the insurance industry.

Khoury-Haq joined The Co-operative Group in August 2019, serving as chief financial officer and head of the life services division, which sells insurance and provides funeral care and legal services.

In May 2022, she was appointed interim CEO following the departure of Steve Murrells, becoming the group's first female CEO in its 159-year history. She was confirmed as permanent CEO in August 2022. Khoury-Haq is one of only a handful of women CEOs leading FTSE 100 or equivalent businesses in the UK. She earns an annual salary of £750,000, plus a bonus, bringing her total compensation to over £1 million in past years.

Personal life 
Khoury-Haq has twin daughters. In 2022, she told The Sunday Times that each of her children would receive a single Christmas gift in solidarity with people experiencing financial challenges. She lives in Cheshire, England.

References

Living people
Ohio State University Fisher College of Business alumni
The Co-operative Group
People from Beirut
Australian National University alumni
British retail chief executives
1971 births